Raghiba Khatoun is a neighbourhood of Baghdad, Iraq. 

Neighborhoods in Baghdad